Dr Sulaiman Shahabuddin is the third President of the Aga Khan University and a former health care executive. Prior to taking office on 15 September 2021, Dr Shahabuddin served as the Regional CEO of the Aga Khan Health Services (AKHS) in East Africa. 

As President of the Aga Khan University, Sulaiman Shahabuddin leads an institution with 3,200 students on three continents, seven hospitals that treat 2 million patients in a typical year and a record of research excellence that has led to it being ranked among the top 100 universities in the world in several fields in recent years. 

President Shahabuddin is an accomplished health care leader, has played a key role in launching multiple academic programmes at AKU and is intimately familiar with both Pakistan and East Africa, the two regions in which the bulk of the University’s operations are conducted. Prior to taking office on September 15, 2021, President Shahabuddin served as Regional CEO of the Aga Khan Health Services (AKHS) in East Africa. AKHS operates four hospitals and 44 outreach centres in Kenya and Tanzania, has 2,100 employees and cares for more than 1 million patients annually. During his tenure, AKHS attracted almost $150 million in external funding for expanding facilities and care, increased access for low-income patients, achieved international accreditation for three hospitals and successfully implemented public-private partnerships. 

Between 2001 and 2005, President Shahabuddin was CEO of the Aga Khan Hospital, Mombasa and the Aga Khan Hospital, Nairobi (now the Aga Khan University Hospital, Nairobi). In total, he has lived and worked in East Africa for 20 years. 

While in East Africa, President Shahabuddin worked closely with academic leaders at the Aga Khan University to launch the University’s academic nursing programmes in the region, as well as its postgraduate medical education programmes in Nairobi and Dar es Salaam.  

President ​​Shahabuddin started his career in Pakistan, where he was born, raised and educated. He attended the Institute of Business Administration in Karachi, earning a Bachelor of Business Administration and an MBA. Shortly after graduating in 1986, he joined AKU, where he spent the first 15 years of his career, rising to the position of Director of Materials Management. While at AKU, he established the Aga Khan Development Network’s Health Group Purchasing Programme, which now supports $80 million in purchasing in nine countries. 

President Shahabuddin is married with two children and has two AKU alumni in his immediate family. His wife, Zeenat, received her nursing degree from AKU and went on to earn a Doctorate in nursing at Johns Hopkins University. Today she is the global Head of Quality, Clinical Programmes and Projects for AKHS, as well as the new Regional CEO for AKHS in East Africa. The couple’s daughter, Anjiya, earned her medical degree from AKU. Their son, Basim, is a graduate of the University of Toronto.

In addition to his MBA, President Shahabuddin holds an MSc in Sustainable Development from Imperial College London/SOAS University and a Doctorate of Health Administration degree from Central Michigan University.

References

Aga Khan University people
Living people
Year of birth missing (living people)